Lenoxburg is an unincorporated community in Bracken and Pendleton counties, in the U.S. state of Kentucky.

History
A post office was established at Lenoxburg in 1874, and remained in operation until it was discontinued in 1906. The community was probably named for Samuel B. Lenox, a local merchant.

References

Unincorporated communities in Bracken County, Kentucky
Unincorporated communities in Pendleton County, Kentucky
Unincorporated communities in Kentucky